Hugh James Pearson Allan (7 August 1928 – 26 June 2013) was a Canadian Anglican bishop.

Allan was educated at the University of Manitoba. He was ordained in 1955 and began his ordained ministry with curacies in Winnipeg, after which he spent four years as a missionary at Peguis First Nation. From 1960 to 1968 he was Rector of St Mark's Winnipeg and then Rural Dean of Cypress. He was Dean of Qu'Appelle and Rector of St Paul's Cathedral, Regina until his ordination to the episcopate as the 6th Bishop of Keewatin in 1974. He resigned his see in 1991 and was an assistant bishop in the Diocese of Nova Scotia and Prince Edward Island until 1994. He died on June 26, 2013.

References

1928 births
2013 deaths
20th-century Anglican Church of Canada bishops
University of Manitoba alumni
Anglican bishops of Keewatin
People from Winnipeg
Deans of Qu'Appelle